The 1901 North Carolina Tar Heels football team was an American football team that represented the University of North Carolina as a member of the Southern Intercollegiate Athletic Association (SIAA) during the 1901 SIAA season.  In its first season under head coach Charles O. Jenkins, the team compiled a 7–2 record (2–1 against SIAA opponents). Albert M. Carr was the team captain. The team was suspended from the conference in 1902 for paying baseball players.

Schedule

Players

Line

Backfield

Subs

Unlisted

References

North Carolina
North Carolina Tar Heels football seasons
North Carolina Tar Heels football